Rugiaevit, Rugievit or Ruyevit is a god of the Slavic Rani worshipped on Rügen, mentioned in only two sources: Gesta Danorum and in Knýtlinga saga. His temple, along with those of Porevit and Porenut, was located in the gord of Charenza, probably today's Garz. The statue of him had seven faces, seven swords at his belt and an eighth one in his hand. Under his lips was a nest of swallows. Mostly associated with the sphere of war, but also sexual.

"Private", from the point of view of rulers, cult of Rugiaevit competed with the "public" and theocratic cult of Svetovit of Arkona.

Sources 
The first source to mention Rugiaevit is the Gesta Danorum by Saxo Grammaticus. Saxo describes when, after Arkona was captured by the Danish king Valdemar I, its inhabitants made an agreement with him, which encourages the inhabitants of Charenza to make a similar agreement and surrender the city without a fight. Saxo describes how the stronghold had three temples dedicated to Rugiaevit, Porevit and Porenut and the destruction of the idol of Rugiaevit in June 1168:

Then, after overthrowing the idols of Porevit and Porenut, Bishop Absalon ordered all three to be taken outside the town to be burned there so as not to expose the village to fire. Saxo here describes a superstition related to sexual acts, but it is not clear with which god this superstition is associated:

The same information is then given by Knýtlinga saga, which lists Rugiaevit in the distorted form Rinvit.

Interpretations 
There are two ways to read this theonym. The name Rugiaevit is most often translated as "lord, ruler of Rügen". Often scholars propose to read the name as Ruyevit; Aleksander Gieysztor suggests combining the first part of this reading with the root ru- existing in such words as řuti "to roar", ruja "roar of deer", "estrous, heat" (as well as "fertility"), which occurs in the Old Russian word rujenь – a term for one of the autumn months that falls during the time of the estrous cycle (cf. Czech říjen, Bulgarian руен (ruen), Serbo-Croatian ру̑јан, rujan). Lubor Niederle, assuming the phonetic similarity of Ruyevit and Yarovit, concluded that the two gods were identical. The suffix -vit translates as "lord, ruler"; it is less often compared with the word vitędzь due to the borrowing of this word from Germanic languages (cf. viking).

The functions of the god remain a matter of debate. Saxo primarily regards Rugiaevit as a war god – the equivalent of the Roman Mars. According to Saxo, one of the Charenza gods, probably Rugiaevit, was associated with punishing sexual intercourse, perhaps near the temple, with vaginismus. According to Gieysztor, Ruyevit was an incarnation of Perun, and links warlike qualities, etymology ("heat", 'fertility'), and punishment for sexual intercourse, with the Vedic Indra, who also combines warlike and sexual functions.

The meaning of the seven faces is unclear. Comparative studies suggest that polycephaly is associated with cosmological ideas: the duality of nature, the threefold or sevenfold vertical system, or the fourfold horizontal system. Gieysztor noted the similarity to the myth of an eastern Finnic people about seven brothers turning into birds, but as he noted, it is unclear how this motif would have made its way to Rügen.

Swallows, which caused the Danes to laugh, are sometimes called "God's birds" and among the Slavs are considered the harbinger of spring and the personification of souls, and this would tie Ruyevit to spring as well.

According to Jacek Banaszkiewicz, a Polish professor of medieval history, the Charenza gods should not be viewed as three different, "random" gods, but as a specific set of deities. He notes that during the Middle Ages, princely and royal authorities chose as their capital cities or towns where the largest cult centers were located, and cites Kyiv or Uppsala as examples. In the temple at Uppsala, a trinity consisting of Thor, Odin, and Freyr was worshipped. Each of the gods, according to Georges Dumézil's trifunctional hypothesis, was responsible for a particular area, fundamental for the existence of the society: Thor was the most powerful god, sat on the middle throne, was responsible for the weather, and thus for the harvest, and is also the thunderer, Odin was responsible for war, and Freyr for peace, prosperity, and pleasure. Banaszkiewicz notes, however, that there are often shifts in competence between the first two gods. In the case of the Rugian trinity, however, he offers a different interpretation. On the basis of comparative mythology, he considers Rugiaevit to be the chief god of the Rani, as evidenced by the most magnificent temple in the middle of the castle, a purple color, statue made of oak, who leads the battle and is the ruler of Rügen and the Rugian community. On the other hand, he considers Porevit and Porenut as divine twins who complement the chief deity with their universal qualities. This interpretation is supported by the fact that chief deities in other religions are also sometimes worshipped together with divine twins (where the chief god is the father of the twins). A similar view was expressed by Gieysztor, who considered Ruyevit to be a local hypostasis of Perun.

References

Bibliography 

 
 
 
 
 

Slavic gods
War gods
Fertility gods